Kohrville, also named Korville and Pilotville, is an unincorporated community in Harris County, Texas.

History

The town was founded before 1870 by freed slaves from Alabama, and named after a German immigrant called Paul Kohrmann, who was the first postmaster of the town. The first post office was established in the town in 1881. By the 1960s the town was home to more than 100 families, though economically deprived. By the 1990s the population had fallen to around 50.

In 2016 the historic African-American cemetery at Kohrville, established in 1881, received state recognition as a state historical monument.

Education
Land in Kohrville is within the Klein Independent School District. The Kohrville School, originally located on Kohrville-Huffsmith Road, was called the "little school on the hill" by the Kohrville citizens. The first Kohrville School was founded in 1895 by Deacons Thomas Amos and Doug Cossey. This was in the day when black and white students were taught in separate schools. In 1928, Kohrville was consolidated with other area common schools to form Rural High #1, which became Klein I./S.D. in 1938. In 1949, a new Kohrville School was built, which is pictured here. The architect was the firm of Alfred C. Finn, a famous Houston architect who designed many famous buildings in Houston, Galveston, and other Texas cities in that period. He also designed the San Jacinto Monument. On 1967, once Klein schools were fully integrated, the Kohrville School closed. For several years it was used as a community center. Today the Kohrville School is part of the Klein Museum complex.
http://www.kleinisd.net/default.aspx?name=hf.photo.escho
The area is served by:
Kohrville Elementary School
Krimmel Intermediate School (Rezoned from Hildebrandt Intermediate School in fall 2007)
Klein Oak High School

References

External links
Texas Escapes - Kohrville, Texas
 KOHRVILLE, TEXAS Handbook of Texas Online article
Kohrville - The Heritage of North Harris County at the Portal to Texas History
Historical Marker — Atlas Number 5507013648 
Historical Marker — Atlas Number 5201012869 
  Klein Independent School District Historical Foundation Online article

Unincorporated communities in Texas
Unincorporated communities in Harris County, Texas